Websters Crossing is a hamlet and census-designated place (CDP) in the town of Springwater, Livingston County, New York, United States. Its population was 69 as of the 2010 census. New York State Route 15 passes through the community.

Geography
The community is in the southeast part of Livingston County, in the northwest corner of the town of Springwater. NY 15 leads northwest  to Conesus Hamlet and southeast  to the hamlet of Springwater.

The community is in the valley of South McMillan Creek near its headwaters. The creek flows northwest past Conesus hamlet into Conesus Lake, the westernmost of New York's Finger Lakes and part of the Genesee River watershed.

Demographics

References

Hamlets in Livingston County, New York
Hamlets in New York (state)
Census-designated places in Livingston County, New York
Census-designated places in New York (state)